Angus Williams may refer to:
 Angus Williams (American football)
 Angus Williams (rugby union)